Xi County or Xixian is a county in the southeast of Henan province, China. It is the northernmost county-level division of Xinyang. The primary dialect is Zhongyuan Mandarin.

Administrative divisions
As 2012, this county is divided to 6 towns and 14 townships.
Towns

Townships

Climate

References

 
County-level divisions of Henan
Xinyang